Alfredo Gutiérrez may refer to:

Alfredo Gutiérrez (American football) (born 1995), Mexican American football player
Alfredo Gutiérrez (musician) (born 1940), Colombian accordion player and singer
Alfredo Gutiérrez Ortiz Mena (born 1969), Mexican judge